State Route 16 (SR 16) is a state highway in the U.S. state of Tennessee. Its southern terminus is at the Alabama state line, where it continues as State Route 79 (SR 79) in Alabama. From there, it continues to Winchester, where it becomes unsigned in a concurrency with U.S. Route 41A (US 41A). This concurrency lasts until its northern terminus in Williamson County, at a junction with U.S. Route 31A (US 31A).

Route description

Franklin County

SR 16 begins at the Alabama State Line in Franklin County, on top of a very tall ridge, where it  continues as State Route 79, several miles north of Scottsboro, AL. It continues north as a very curvy 2-lane highway before exiting the mountains and lowering down into some farmland. It then goes north to enter Winchester at an interchange with US 64 and SR 15, a 4-lane bypass of Winchester, before turning east and entering downtown. In downtown, it comes to an intersection with  US 41A, SR 50, and SR 130. SR 16 continues east and becomes the unsigned companion route of US 41A, while also being concurrent with SR 50. US 41A/SR 16 then turn north at an intersection where SR 50 separates and continues east into Decherd. They then have an intersection with SR 127 before leaving Winchester. They then go north as a 2-lane highway through flat farmland before crossing the Elk River and going through Estill Springs, where it has an intersection with SR 279 and passes by the Arnold Air Force Base and the Woods Reservoir before crossing the Coffee County line and entering Tullahoma.

Coffee County

US 41A/SR 16 then immediately enter downtown Tullahoma after crossing into Coffee County, where they intersect and become concurrent with SR 55/SR 130. They then go north through downtown before SR 55/SR 130 split off and west concurrent with each other and US 41A/SR 16 then pass through a major business district before intersecting with SR 269 and leaving Tullahoma, where it briefly crosses into Moore County before entering Bedford County.

Bedford County

In Bedford County, US 41A/SR 16 then turn west and pass just south of Normandy before having an intersection with SR 276. They then enter Shelbyville at an intersection with SR 437, just feet before their intersection with SR 64. US 41A/SR 16 then continue through some suburban areas and pass by an industrial park before entering downtown and having an intersection with US 231 Business/SR 10/SR 82. They then have an intersection with US 231/SR 387 before leaving downtown and going through another suburban area before leaving Shelbyville and turning northwest. US 41A/SR 16 go northwest through some countryside and have an intersection with SR 270 before passing through Unionville, turning north temporarily before going northwest again. They then pass through more countryside before crossing into Rutherford County.

Rutherford County

In Rutherford County, US 41A/SR 16 then go northwest to an intersection and becoming concurrent with SR 99 before entering Eagleville, where they have another intersection and short concurrency with SR 269, where SR 99 splits off and goes east to follow SR 269. US 41A/SR 16 then continue through Eagleville before continuing northwest and crossing into Williamson County.

Williamson County

After crossing into Williamson County, US 41A/SR 16 then continues for a very short distance before coming to a Y-intersection with US 31A/SR 11 in Kirkland, just north of College Grove and just south of I-840 and Triune. At this intersection, US 41A continues north and becomes concurrent with US 31A/SR 11 while SR 16 ends here.

Major intersections

References 

016
Transportation in Franklin County, Tennessee
Transportation in Coffee County, Tennessee
Transportation in Lincoln County, Tennessee
Transportation in Moore County, Tennessee
Transportation in Bedford County, Tennessee
Transportation in Rutherford County, Tennessee
Transportation in Williamson County, Tennessee